Dean Cokinos is an American football coach.

College career
Cokinos attended University of Massachusetts Boston, where he was a running back for the Beacons. He was a college teammate of Pat Sperduto, whom he later served under in Nashville.

Coaching career
.Cokinos was an assistant coach for the Nashville Kats from 2005 to 2007. While with the Cats, he was also tasked with evaluating professional arena/indoor football players for the Tennessee Titans, who then owned the Kats. Cokinos was later head coach of the Alabama Vipers, Georgia Force and New Orleans VooDoo, helping the Force reach the playoffs in 2011 and 2012. He coached the Tennessee Valley Vipers to a 56 to 55 overtime victory against the Spokane Shock in ArenaCup IX. Cokinos served as head coach of the Alabama Hammers of the Professional Indoor Football League from 2013 to 2014, winning the PIFL Championship in 2013 and being named Coach of the Year. He was named assistant head coach and defensive coordinator of the Tampa Bay Storm on October 26, 2015. On May 5, 2016, Cokinos was named the inaugural head coach for the Washington Arena Football League Team, which was later named the Washington Valor. He held this position until May 16, 2018, when he was relieved of his position as coach of the then-winless Valor.

In 2019, he served as defensive coordinator of the Berlin Rebels in Germany.

In 2022, Cokinos was hired as the head football coach for Knoxville Catholic High School.

Head coaching record

AFL

af2, IFL and PIFL

References

External links
ArenaFan stats
Just Sports Stats

Living people
Year of birth missing (living people)
Austin Peay Governors football coaches
West Alabama Tigers football coaches
Nashville Kats coaches
Alabama Vipers coaches
Georgia Force coaches
New Orleans VooDoo coaches
Tampa Bay Storm coaches
Washington Valor coaches
UMass–Boston Beacons football players
American football running backs
Wilkes-Barre/Scranton Pioneers coaches
American expatriate sportspeople in Germany